The 2018 Red Bull Ring FIA Formula 2 round was a pair of motor races for Formula 2 cars that took place on 30 June and 1 July 2018 at the Red Bull Ring in Spielberg, in Austria as part of the FIA Formula 2 Championship. It was the sixth round of the 2018 FIA Formula 2 Championship and ran in support of the 2018 Austrian Grand Prix.

Background
The round saw the introduction of rolling starts following a series of drivers stalling on the grid in previous rounds. The procedure was introduced in response to a start-line accident in a Formula 3 race that saw a driver crash into a car that had stalled on the grid.

Classification

Qualifying

Feature race

Notes
 – Maximilian Günther had 20 seconds (equivalent to a stop and go penalty) added to his race time for an unsafe release.

Sprint race

Championship standings after the round

Drivers' Championship standings

Teams' Championship standings

References

External links 

 

Red Bull Ring
Formula 2
Auto races in Austria
Red Bull Ring FIA Formula 2 round
Red Bull Ring FIA Formula 2 round